Syncarpha argyropsis is a species of flowering plant. It was first described as Helipterum argyropsis by DC., and given the current name of Rune Bertil Nordenstam. Syncarpha argyropsis belongs to the genus Syncarpha, and family Asteraceae.

References 

Gnaphalieae
Flora of South Africa